The Voice of Love is the second album by American dream pop singer Julee Cruise. It was released on October 12, 1993.

Background and content 
Some of the songs on the album were taken from previous David Lynch productions. "Up in Flames" had previously appeared on Lynch's 1990 musical play Industrial Symphony No. 1; "Questions in a World of Blue", an instrumental version of "She Would Die for Love", and an instrumental version of "The Voice of Love" were all included in the film Twin Peaks: Fire Walk with Me, which was also directed by David Lynch and in which Cruise makes a brief appearance. An instrumental version of "Kool Kat Walk" appeared in Lynch's 1990 film Wild at Heart.

Track listing

Personnel 
 Angelo Badalamenti – arrangements, conduction, synthesizer, piano, production
 David Lynch – lyrics, artwork, percussion, production
 Julee Cruise – vocals
 Vincent Bell – guitar
 Gerry Brown – drums
 Reggie Hamilton – bass guitar
 Jim Hynes – trumpet
 Nick Kirgo– guitar
 Kinny Landrum – synthesizer
 Sam Merendino – drums
 Art Pohlemus – mixing (tracks 5 and 10)
 Tom Ranier – keyboards
 Albert Regni – tenor saxophone
 Grady Tate – drums
 Buster Williams – acoustic bass guitar

 Technical
 John Karpowich – mixing (tracks 1 to 4, 6 to 9, 11)
 Stephen Marcussen – mastering
 E. J. Carr – sleeve photography
 Tom Recchion – sleeve artwork

References

External links 
 

1993 albums
Julee Cruise albums
Warner Records albums
Albums produced by David Lynch